"Drown" is a song by Dutch DJ and producer Martin Garrix, featuring Australian singer-songwriter Clinton Kane. The song was released on 27 February 2020. The song plays to the feeling of taking the good and bad in a relationship, knowing that as long as you're with them, you'll be happy.

Charts

Weekly charts

Year-end charts

References

2020 singles
2020 songs
Martin Garrix songs
Clinton Kane songs
Stmpd Rcrds singles
Song recordings produced by Martin Garrix
Songs written by Clinton Kane
Songs written by Martin Garrix
Songs written by Jonny Coffer
Songs written by Justin Parker
Songs written by Mikky Ekko